Matteo Zanni (born 17 February 1987) is an Italian ice dancing coach and former competitor. With Anna Cappellini, he won four medals on the ISU Junior Grand Prix series (two gold) and bronze at the 2004 JGP Final.

Career 
Zanni competed with partner Anna Cappellini from 2001 through 2005. They won the bronze medal at the 2004 Junior Grand Prix final and then placed fifth at the World Junior Championships. In the 2006-07 season, he competed with Camilla Pistorello. They were the 2007 Italian junior national champions. In the 2007-08 season, he competed with Natalia Mityushina. Their partnership ended following that season.

Zanni joined Holiday On Ice and performed as part of the Mystery Tour in South America. In 2011, he coached Olympic champion swimmer Inge de Bruijn during the 4th edition of the Dutch television series Sterren Dansen Op Het IJs and skated with the singer Shaya in Dancing on Ice Greece. He interviewed the Italian rockstar Patty Pravo (Nicoletta Strambelli) in late 2011. In 2013, he joined Feld Entertainment Group to tour the US East Coast and then retired from performing. 

Matteo have been coaching for several years in Barbara Fusar Poli's team. They split at the end of the season 15/16 and he created his own ice dance team.
In July 2016, he became an International Technical Specialist.

Zanni currently coaches in Milan alongside Barbara Riboldi and Paola Mezzadri.

Personal life 
In his early years, he studied Classical Guitar and Composition.
On 18 February 2013, Zanni became a doctor in International Relations at Università Cattolica del Sacro Cuore. He enjoys photography.

Competitive highlights

With Mitiushina

With Pistorello

With Cappellini

Skating programs

With Mitiushina

With Pistorello

With Cappellini

References

External links 
 
 
 
 

1987 births
Living people
Italian male ice dancers
Figure skaters from Milan
Italian figure skating coaches